Matic Suholežnik (born 2 May 1995) is a Slovenian handball player who plays for RK Celje and the Slovenian national team.

He represented Slovenia at the 2018 European Men's Handball Championship.

References

1995 births
Living people
Sportspeople from Celje
Slovenian male handball players
Expatriate handball players
Slovenian expatriate sportspeople in France
Slovenian expatriate sportspeople in Portugal
Mediterranean Games competitors for Slovenia
Competitors at the 2018 Mediterranean Games
21st-century Slovenian people